The persecution of Cristalino David Ozora Latumahina On February 20, 2023, was persecuted by Mario Dandy Satriyo with his partner, Shane Lukas Rotua Pangondianpada, at Green Permata Residences, South Jakarta, Indonesia. He was later suspected by Greater Jakarta Metropolitan Regional Police and was charged with abusing a minor.

This case has attracted the attention of the people in Indonesia and the international community regarding the backgrounds of the perpetrators and victims involved in the persecution. The victim is known to be the child of one of the central administrators of the Ansor Youth Movement, the Nahdlatul Ulama wing of the organization. Meanwhile, Mario's father, who was the perpetrator of the persecution, was previously an official at the Regional Office of the Directorate General of Taxes, Ministry of Finance, South Jakarta II. The credibility of the Ministry of Finance as a tax collection state institution was questioned due to allegations of misuse of his father's assets as an official within the Directorate General of Taxes for personal gain.

Background

Victim

Cristalino David Ozora Latumahina
The victim, on behalf of Cristalino David Ozora, is known to be a teenager from Muntilan, Magelang, Central Java, in a Catholic family environment. Having studied at a Catholic school up to junior high school level, he decided to study at Islamic boarding schools in Bogor, West Java he listed to study at Islamic boarding school in Bogor, West Java he is listed as a student at SMA Pangudi Luhur 1 Jakarta.His father, Jonathan Latumahina, is a convert who joined the the central board of the Ansor Youth Movement.He was noted to be active in the activities held by this organization, including when he documented his activities on social media.

Perpetrator
Mario Dandy Satriyo: Son of Officer Directorate General of Taxes or Directorate General of Taxes Rafael Alun Trisambodo who serves as Head of the General Section of DGT Kanwil South Jakarta II.Currently, Mario Dandy is 20 years old. He is a student of Prasetiya Mulya University, South Tangerang City. Previously Mario attended SMA Taruna Nusantara MagelangMario is known to have moved schools and this is evidenced by a School Transfer Certificate Number Sket/566/VII/2021 issued on July 5, 2021. The son of a former tax official is known to often share videos of himself flexing ' aka showing off his wealth in the form of luxury vehicles, starting from when he was driving a Harley Davidson to a black Rubicon car.
Shane Lukas Rotua Pangondian Lumbantoruan: One of Mario Dandy Satriyo's close friends who committed the assault on David. Shane Lukas is currently 19 years old and has just graduated from high school. Previously, he received his senior secondary education at PSKD Kebayoran Baru High School.After his identity was revealed by the South Jakarta Metro Police Chief, netizens found quite surprising facts about Shane Lukas. He is suspected of being a student receiving Jakarta Smart Card or KJP Plus funds.
Agnes Gracia Haryanto: Girlfriend of Mario Dandy Satrio and former victim of abuse David Ozora. It is known that Agnes is currently 15 years old and is studying in the tenth grade at SMA Tarakanita 1 Jakarta. Agnes Gracia Haryanto educational institution is one of the favorite schools among the elite. Information is circulating that Agnes Gracia Haryanto is the adopted daughter of the parents who raised her.

Chronology
Based on the official release GP Ansor DKI, David experienced abuse and beatings shortly after he received a WhatsApp message from his ex-girlfriend with the initials A, Monday (20/2 ). At that time David was playing at the house of one of his friends with the initials R at Green Permata Housing Complex, Ulujami, Pesanggrahan, South Jakarta. David's ex-girlfriend at that time sent a short message which basically informed him of his intention to return the student card. Shortly after the location was sent, the black Jeep Rubicon driven by Mario stopped in front of David's friend's house. David then approached the car which turned out to be in it boarded by four people. Two of the four people then got out of the car and took David to a quiet alley. It was there that David was beaten to a pulp. The police confirmed that this abuse started after A, who is also a friend of Mario, complained that he was being treated badly. It was from there that Mario went to David, who was at the house of his friend with the initial R at Pesanggrahan. "Then after MDS met D, they immediately asked for clarification regarding the bad behavior and a debate ensued which led to the persecution of D's brother," said South Jakarta Metro Police Chief Kombes Ade Ary Syam Indradi in his statement, Wednesday (22/2). He also heard the commotion going on in front of his house. They also saw David in a lying position near Mario. After that, R's parents immediately took David to Medika Permata Hijau Hospital with the help of complex security to receive medical treatment. "Furthermore, the perpetrator was secured by complex security and officers from the Pesanggrahan Police. Furthermore, the perpetrator was taken to the Pesanggrahan Police," said Ade Ary.

Investigation
The investigation into this case leads to two main cases, namely the examination of the perpetrators and witnesses of the persecution and the examination of the assets of the main perpetrators of the persecution.

Suspect of persecution
The Greater Jakarta Metropolitan Police took over the case after being handled by the South Jakarta Police. As of early March 2023, the police have named three suspects in this case.
1. Shane Lukas Rotua Pangondian Lumbantoruan became a suspect for recording the assault carried out by Mario Dandy Satrio (20) on D at the Grand Permata Complex, Pesanggrahan, South Jakarta, Thursday 2 March 2023. As for Shane Pangondian, in this case he has been charged with the Article snaring Article 355 paragraph 1 juncto Article 56 of the Criminal Code, subsidiary 354 paragraph 1 juncto 56 of the Criminal Code, subsidiary of Article 353 paragraph 2 juncto 56 of the Criminal Code, subsidiary of Article 351 paragraph 2 junto 56 of the Criminal Code.As of early March 2023, the police have named three suspects in this case.
2. Mario Dandy Satriyo In connection with the persecution of David Latumahina, Mario Dandy was charged with Article 355 of the Criminal Code paragraph 1 subsidiary Article 354 paragraph 1 of the Criminal Code subsidiary 353 paragraph 2 of the Criminal Code subsidiary 351 paragraph 2 of the Criminal Code in conjunction with Article 76c Jo 80 of the Child Protection Act. "With a maximum threat of 12 years in prison. That's for MDS," said the Director of General Criminal Investigation of Polda Metro Jaya, Kombes Hengki Haryadi during a press conference at Polda Metro Jaya, Thursday, March 2, 2023.
3. Agnes Gracia Haryanto was charged with Article 76c Juncto Article 80 Law Number 35 of 2014 concerning Juvenile Justice and/or Article 355 Paragraph 1 Juncto Article 56 Subsidiary Article 354 Paragraph 1 Juncto Article 56 Subsidiary Article 353 paragraph 2 Juncto Article 56 Subsidiary 351 paragraph 2 Juncto Article 56 KUHP. in a press conference, Thursday 2 March 2023.

Examination of Rafael Alun's assets 
The Ministry of Finance (Ministry of Finance) also summoned Rafael Alun Trisambodo to examine his assets. The Director General of Taxes, Suryo Utomo confirmed the summons and it has been handled by the Directorate of Internal Compliance and Transformation of Apparatus Resources (KITSDA) in collaboration with the Inspectorate General of the Ministry of Finance.The Minister of Finance (Minister of Finance) Sri Mulyani said the amount of assets of Rafael Alun Trisambodo, an official at the Directorate General of Taxes, the father of Mario Dandy who abused the son of GP Ansor manager David until he fell into a coma, is absurd. According to Sri Mulyani, the amount of property owned by her men was not quite reasonable. Based on Report on Wealth of State Officials Ministry of Finance, Rafael's assets will exceed IDR 56.1 billion by the end of 2021. Even though he is only listed as echelon III at the DGT.

Impact

Rafael Alun Trisambodo Lost Position
Rafael Alun Trisambodo (RAT), Mario Dandy Satrio's parents were removed from the position of Head of the General Section of the Directorate General of Taxes for the South Jakarta Regional Office "In order for the Ministry of Finance to be able to carry out audits, starting today RAT, I ask you to be removed from your duties and positions" said The Minister of Finance, Sri Mulyani Sri Mulyani also revealed the basis for the dismissal of Rafael Alun Trisambodo, and then asked to determine the level of punishment for violating the disciplinary norms of tax officials. "The basis for the removal from a structural position is article 31 paragraph 1 PP 94 of 2021, regarding the discipline of Civil Servants," said Sri Mulyani.
After being removed from his position at the Directorate General of Taxes, Rafael Alun was then removed from his status as State Civil Apparatus (ASN). After being removed from his position at the Directorate General of Taxes, Rafael Alun was then removed from his status as State Civil Apparatus (ASN).

Mario was expelled from Prasetiya Mulya University
"The Prasetiya Mulya University Leadership Meeting decided to expel the suspect Mr. Mario Dandy Satriyo from Prasetiya Mulya University as of February 23, 2023," Djisman wrote in a letter uploaded, Friday.Prasetiya Mulya University did not wait long to respond to the violence case committed by Mario Dandy. The Chancellor of Prasetiya Mulya University said that the university strongly criticized Mario's actions. "Strictly condemn this act of violence because it is against humanity and violates the code of ethics and regulations contained in the Prasetiya Mulya University Student Manual," said Prasetiya Mulya University Chancellor Djisman Simandjuntak in a release received. The campus also expressed deep concern over the condition of the victim's serious injuries. Furthermore, Prasetiya Mulya University also said that Mario had been officially expelled from the university. "The Prasetiya Mulya University Leadership Meeting decided to expel the suspect Mr. Mario Dandy Satriyo from Prasetiya Mulya University as of February 23, 2023," said Djisman.

Mario's Cost Will Be Investigated
Ministry of Finance of the Republic of Indonesia (Ministry of Finance) also suspects Mario Dandy's luxury boarding house in the Blok M area, South Jakarta. No wonder the existence of this luxury boarding house raises suspicion. This is because Mario Dandy himself is still relatively young, namely 20 years old. However, Mario Dandy, who is the son of a tax official, already has various luxury assets. Reporting from WartakotaLive.com, Friday (24/2/2023), the Ministry of Finance intervened to determine whether the luxury boarding house really belonged to Mario or actually belonged to his father, Rafael Alun. For this reason, the Ministry of Finance also cooperates with the Corruption Eradication Commission (KPK) and the Financial Transaction Reports and Analysis Center (PPATK).

Agnes resigned from SMA Tarakanita I Jakarta 
Mario Dandy's lover, Agnes Gracia Haryanto, decided to resign from Tarakanita I High School Jakarta. The woman's resignation was due to Mario Dandy's abuse case against David. This was conveyed by Ferdie Soethiono as a lawyer for SMA Tarakanita I Jakarta. Based on Ferdie Soethiono's statement, the AG alias Agnes family said this was done so that other parties would not be dragged into this case. "The family realizes that the current situation affects various parties, both teachers and alumni students so, not to mention this, education can be disrupted from AG's friends," said Ferdie Soethiono, Saturday, March 4 2023. "Because of these considerations, family and AG submitted an application for resignation. AG alias Agnes was declared to have resigned from Tarakanita I Jakarta High School since February 28, 2023.

Feedback

Central Government
President of the Republic of Indonesia Joko Widodo said he was monitoring cases of non-compliance and showing off wealth from former Tax and Customs officials at the Ministry of Finance. The President asked the Ministers and heads of institutions to discipline officials in their respective agencies. Jokowi said it was inappropriate for officials to show off their wealth or hedonism on social media. Jokowi emphasized that this instruction must be carried out in all agencies. Jokowi asked agency leaders to discipline all levels in the institution.

Vice President of the Republic of Indonesia, Ma'ruf Amin also gave his response to the persecution. Quoted from suara.com Vice President Ma'ruf Amin emphasized that unscrupulous state apparatus who flaunt a luxurious lifestyle can result in a loss of public trust. Wapres mengatakan bahwa stiap pejabat dari atas sampai ke bawah harus menerapkan gaya hidup sederhana, bukan hidup yang berlebihan.
Apart from that, the Vice President also supports what Mrs. Sri Muryani has done in handling this case. According to the Vice President, what the Minister of Finance did was correct and correct.

Minister of Finance Sri Mulyani apologized to the parents of Cristalino David Ozora, the victim of abuse by the child of an official of the Director General of Taxes, Mario Dandy Satrio Sri Mulyani admitted that she also fully supports the legal process against the perpetrators. According to him, the heinous acts of persecution must not be allowed to continue and be repeated, and cannot be justified for any reason.

Expert Staff to the Minister of Finance for Tax Compliance Suryo Utomo condemned the violence that occurred. He also supports the consistent handling of the law by the competent authorities, and he said that the DGT will be cooperative.

Minister of Religion (Minister of Religion) Yaqut Cholil Qoumas confirmed that he would continue to oversee the case of the persecution of David Ozora Latumahina, son of GP Ansor administrator Jonathan Latumahina. He wanted the suspect in the persecution of David to be punished as fairly as possible. Menteri Agama (Menag) Yaqut Cholil Qoumas menyebut pihak keluarga tidak membuka opsi damai terhadap pelaku penganiayaan David Latumahina.

Indonesia's Coordinating Minister for Political, Legal and Security Affairs Mahfud MD asked the police to apply 2 articles of serious persecution, namely 354 of the Criminal Code and 355 of the Criminal Code. According to Mahfud, the two articles were deemed more appropriate for the perpetrators and fair for the victims.

Society
Head of LBH Ansor Youth Movement Center Abdul Qadir in his statement, Thursday (23/2). They asked that the case be investigated immediately. "LBH Ansor appealed to all parties to stop spreading videos of violent incidents out of respect for victims who are undergoing treatment and their families.

Deputy Secretary General of PBNU, Imron Rosyadi hopes that those involved in the persecution of David can be prosecuted fairly. The reason is to give a deterrent effect to those concerned. PBNU also appreciates the police for moving quickly into the case. Imron said that all parties must continue overseeing the case until the suspects are brought to justice.

References

2023 crimes in Indonesia
2023 in Indonesia
February 2023 events in Indonesia